William H. Gentry House, also known as Oak Dale, Cloney Family Farm, and Curry Farm, is a historic home located near Sedalia, Pettis County, Missouri.  It was built about 1855, and is a two-story, vernacular Greek Revival style brick I-house.  It has a central passage plan, two-story rear ell, and features a pedimented, two-story front portico.

It was listed on the National Register of Historic Places in 1997.

References

Houses on the National Register of Historic Places in Missouri
Greek Revival houses in Missouri
Houses completed in 1855
Buildings and structures in Pettis County, Missouri
National Register of Historic Places in Pettis County, Missouri